Sharaq Pur Sharif is an administrative subdivision (Tehsil) located in Sheikhupura District, Punjab, Pakistan. The city of Sharaqpur is the headquarters of tehsil. The population of tehsil is 197,220 according to the 2017 census.

See also 
 List of tehsils of Punjab, Pakistan
Ferozewala Tehsil
Safdarabad Tehsil

References 

Tehsils of Sheikhupura District